Post House or post house may refer to:

 A stilt house also known as a pile dwelling, a historic house type
 A post-production studio
 Post house (historical building), a house or inn with a stable that provided services to travelers and mail carriers

in the United States (by state then city/town)
Joseph W. Post House, Big Sur, California, listed on the National Register of Historic Places (NRHP) in Monterey County
George B. Post House, Pasadena, California, listed on the NRHP in Los Angeles County
Augustus Post House, Hebron, Connecticut, listed on the NRHP in Tolland County
Post House (Alton, Illinois), listed on the NRHP in Madison County
Peter P. Post House, Woodcliff, New Jersey, listed on the NRHP in Bergen County
Post-Williams House, Poughkeepsie, New York, listed on the NRHP
William Post Mansion, Buckhannon, West Virginia, listed on the NRHP in Upshur County

See also
 List of United States post offices, as post house might be an alternate name for "post office"